Justin Lee Collins: Turning Japanese is a British 3-part documentary on Channel 5 in the United Kingdom, it features Justin Lee Collins taking a cultural trip to Japan. In the first episode, Collins visited Tokyo and investigated the relations between the sexes. Episode 2 was set in Osaka and focused on Japanese comedy and other cultural entertainments. The third and final episode returned to Tokyo to examine the lifestyle of a typical local.

References

External links
 

2011 British television series debuts
2011 British television series endings
British documentary television series
Channel 5 (British TV channel) original programming
English-language television shows
Television series by Endemol
Television series by Tiger Aspect Productions
Television shows filmed in Japan